Kebun Binatang Bandung or Bandung Zoological Gardens is a zoo located in Bandung, West Java, Indonesia. It was created in 1933 when two existing zoos in the city (Cimindi zoo and Dago Atas zoo) were combined and moved to the current location on Taman Sari street. The new zoo was located in "Jubileum Park", a botanical garden created in 1923 to celebrate the Silver Jubilee of Queen Wilhelmina of the Netherlands.

References

Tourist attractions in West Java
Buildings and structures in Bandung
Zoos in Indonesia
Zoos established in 1933